The Harveytoons Show is a television series presenting theatrical animated cartoons produced by Famous Studios from 1950 until 1964, which were acquired by Harvey Entertainment.

History
This show features Harvey Comics characters and series including: Casper the Friendly Ghost, Tommy Tortoise and Moe Hare, Baby Huey, Herman and Katnip, Buzzy the Crow, Possum Pearl, Professor Schmatlz, Jeeper and Creeper and others. The New Casper Cartoon Show and the Film Roman version of Richie Rich have also been featured on the final season of The Harveytoons Show. The show itself contained three full cartoons and one "ToonTake", an abbreviated cartoon. Jerry Beck was the show consultant.

The Harveytoons Show broadcast history
 Mid 1990s–Early 2010s: TPI/MNCTV (IDN)
 1990–1994: The Children's Channel (as Casper and Friends) (UK) 
 1998–1999: Fox Family Channel (USA)
 2003–2006: Boomerang (as Casper and Friends) (USA)
 2005-2009: Astro Ceria (Malaysia)
 2008–2011: Tooncast (also as Casper and Friends) (LatAM)
 2008–2012, 2015: Teletoon Retro (also as Casper and Friends) (Canada)
 2011-2016: PBJ (USA)
 2012–2018:  KTV (though in a small selection) (USA)
 2014: Retro TV (USA)
 2016-2019: INTV (IDN)
 2020-present: Nusantara TV (IDN)

Episodes
The show consisted of Famous Studios-produced cartoons from 1950 to 1964. There were 223 theatrical cartoons released during that period, and only 165 cartoons were included in their full format, although the original theatrical titles were changed when Harvey assumed ownership from Famous. The remainder of the 58 cartoons were either only included as fragments or not included. Jerry Beck later explained that the trimming of some cartoons was only done to help each episode fit the half-hour format, and some were excluded from the show either from oversight or because the content of those cartoons could be considered un-PC.

All original television-produced shorts on the show were either from later TV cartoons featuring Casper and the Film Roman version of Richie Rich, and those were mostly featured in the final season of The Harveytoons Show.

Each episode included three full cartoons and one "ToonTake" segment.

Season 1
 Episode 1: Casper the Friendly Ghost – Boo Moon / Harveytoon featuring Little Audrey – Dizzy Dishes / Harveytoon present a Modern Madcap featuring a prototypical Kozmo – Out of This Whirl / Harvey ToonTake – Invention Convention
 Episode 2: Herman and Katnip – Mouse Trapeze / Harveytoon presents Casper the Friendly Ghost - Casper Comes to Clown / Harveytoon presents a Modern Madcap featuring an updated Koko the Clown – Jolly the Clown / Harvey ToonTake featuring Baby Huey – Clown on the Farm
 Episode 3: Scout Fellow featuring Baby Huey / Harveytoon presents Casper the Friendly Ghost – Boo Scout / Harveytoon presents a Modern Madcap featuring Jeeper and Creeper – Scouting for Trouble / Harvey ToonTake featuring Herman and Katnip – Northwest Mousie
 Episode 4: Herman and Katnip – Cat Tamale / Harveytoon presents Casper the Friendly Ghost – Bull Fright / Harveytoon – Pedro and Lorenzo / Harvey ToonTake – Fiesta Time
 Episode 5: Casper the Friendly Ghost – Once Upon a Rhyme / Harveytoon featuring Little Audrey – Little Audrey Riding Hood / Harveytoon presents a Modern Madcap – Dante Dreamer / Harvey ToonTake featuring Tommy Tortoise and Moe Hare – Winner by a Hare
 Episode 6: Herman and Katnip – Mousetro Herman / Harveytoon presents Casper the Friendly Ghost – Boo Bop / Harveytoon – Animal Fair / Harvey ToonTake – Vegetable Vaudeville
 Episode 7: Huey's Ducky Daddy featuring Baby Huey / Harveytoon featuring Little Audrey – The Seapreme Court / Harveytoon featuring Finny – Feast and Furious / Harvey ToonTake featuring Casper the Friendly Ghost – Casper's Spree Under the Sea
 Episode 8: Herman and Katnip – Herman the Cartoonist / Harveytoon presents Casper the Friendly Ghost – Ghost of Honor / Harveytoon presents Tommy Tortoise and Moe Hare – Rabbit Punch / Harvey ToonTake featuring Inchy Worm – Tweet Music
 Episode 9: Casper the Friendly Ghost – Which is Witch / Harveytoon featuring Little Audrey – Case of the Cockeyed Canary / Harveytoon presents a Modern Madcap – Perry Popgun / Harvey ToonTake featuring Tommy Tortoise and Moe Hare – Sleuth But Sure
 Episode 10: Herman and Katnip – Mice Meeting You / Harveytoon presents Casper the Friendly Ghost – True Boo / Harveytoon featuring Baby Huey – Jumping with Toy / Harvey ToonTake featuring Casper the Friendly Ghost – Ice Scream
 Episode 11: Casper the Friendly Ghost – Boos and Saddles / Harveytoon featuring Baby Huey – Git Along Little Ducky / Harveytoon presents a Modern Madcap – Shootin' Stars / Harvey ToonTake featuring Herman and Katnip – Cat Carson Rides Again
 Episode 12: Casper the Friendly Ghost – Casper Takes a Bow-Wow / Harveytoon featuring Little Audrey – Dawg Gone / Harveytoon featuring Martin Kanine – Fido Beta Kappa / Harvey ToonTake featuring Herbert – By Leaps and Hounds
 Episode 13: Herman and Katnip – Cat in the Act / Harveytoon presents Casper the Friendly Ghost – Ghost Writers / Harveytoon presents a Modern Madcap featuring The Cat – Top Cat / HarveyToon Take featuring Baby Huey – Starting from Hatch

Season 2
 Episode 14: Swab the Duck featuring Baby Huey / Harveytoon presents Casper the Friendly Ghost – Deep Boo Sea / Harveytoon presents Herman and Katnip – Ship-a-Hooey / Harvey ToonTake – Drippy Mississippi
 Episode 15: Casper the Friendly Ghost – Boos and Arrows / Harveytoon featuring Baby Huey – Huey's Ducky Daddy / Harveytoon presents Land of the Lost - Land of the Lost Watches / Harvey ToonTake featuring Little Audrey – Fishing Tackler
 Episode 16: Herman and Katnip – Of Mice and Menace / Harveytoon presents Casper the Friendly Ghost – Ghost of the Town / Harveytoon presents a Modern Madcap – TV Fuddlehead / Harvey ToonTake featuring Little Audrey – Law and Audrey
 Episode 17: Casper the Friendly Ghost – Do or Diet / Harveytoon presents Herman and Katnip – You Said a Mouseful / Harveytoon featuring Timothy the Turkey – The Voice of the Turkey / Harvey ToonTake – Hysterical History
 Episode 18: Herman and Katnip – Mice-Capades / Harveytoon presents Casper the Friendly Ghost – Fright from Wrong / Harveytoon – Crazytown / Harvey ToonTake – Houndabout
 Episode 19: Herman and Katnip – One Funny Knight / Harveytoon presents Casper the Friendly Ghost – Red, White, and Boo / Harveytoon presents a Modern Madcap – Silly Science / Harvey ToonTake featuring Inchy Worm – Dizzy Dinosaurs
 Episode 20: Casper the Friendly Ghost – Boo Kind to Animals / Harveytoon featuring Little Audrey – Surf Bored / Harveytoon featuring Spunky – Okey Dokey Donkey / Harvey ToonTake – Fun at the Fair
 Episode 21: Herman and Katnip – Robin Rodenthood / Harveytoon presents Casper the Friendly Ghost – Cage Fright / Harveytoon presents a Modern Madcap featuring The Cat – Bopin Hood / Harvey ToonTake featuring Little Audrey – Hold the Lion, Please
 Episode 22: Pest Pupil featuring Baby Huey / Harveytoon presents Casper the Friendly Ghost – Hooky Spooky / Harveytoon presents a Modern Madcap featuring Kozmo – Kozmo Goes to School / Harvey ToonTake featuring Little Audrey – Fishing Tackler
 Episode 23: One Quack Mind featuring Baby Huey / Harveytoon presents Casper the Friendly Ghost – Heir Restorer / Harveytoon featuring Herbert – By Leaps and Hounds / Harvey ToonTake featuring Herman and Katnip – Surf and Sound
 Episode 24: Casper the Friendly Ghost – Boo Ribbon Winner / Harveytoon featuring Little Audrey – Law and Audrey / Harveytoon presents a Modern Madcap featuring Specs – Cape Kidnaveral / Harvey ToonTake – Candy Cabaret
 Episode 25: Casper the Friendly Ghost – Good Scream Fun / Harveytoon presents Herman and Katnip – Mouseum / Harveytoon presents a Modern Madcap – Fine Feathered Friend (untitled) / Harvey ToonTake featuring Inchy Worm – Forest Fantasy
 Episode 26: Clown on the Farm featuring Baby Huey / Harveytoon presents Casper the Friendly Ghost – Hide and Shriek / Harveytoon presents Modern Madcap featuring Specs – Popcorn Politics (untitled) / Harvey ToonTake – Snooze Reel

Season 3
 Episode 27: Casper the Friendly Ghost – Little Boo Peep / Harveytoon featuring Little Audrey – Fishing Tackler / Harveytoon presents a Modern Madcap featuring Luigi – The Shoe Must Go On / Harvey ToonTake – Gag and Baggage
 Episode 28: Herman and Katnip – A Bicep Built for Two / Harveytoon presents Casper the Friendly Ghost – North Pal / Harveytoon presents a Modern Madcap featuring Kozmo – The Kid from Mars / Harvey ToonTake featuring Little Audrey – The Seapreme Court
 Episode 29: Herman and Katnip – Drinks on the Mouse / Harveytoon presents Casper the Friendly Ghost – Pig-A-Boo / Harveytoon featuring Snappy – News Hound / Harvey ToonTake – Trick or Tree
 Episode 30: Huey's Father's Day featuring Baby Huey / Harveytoon presents Casper the Friendly Ghost – Peek-A-Boo / Harveytoon featuring Loui the Lion – Lion in the Roar / Harvey ToonTake featuring Little Audrey – Dizzy Dishes
 Episode 31: Herman and Katnip – Owly to Bed / Harveytoon presents Casper the Friendly Ghost – Boo-Hoo Baby / Harveytoon presents a Modern Madcap – Bouncing Benny / Harvey ToonTake featuring Harry the Hound – Hound About That
 Episode 32: Herman and Katnip – Sky Scrappers / Harveytoon presents Casper the Friendly Ghost – By the Old Mill Scream / Harveytoon featuring Waxey Weasel and Wishbone – Poop Goes the Weasel / Harvey ToonTake featuring Baby Huey – Pest Pupil
 Episode 33: Starting from Hatch featuring Baby Huey / Harveytoon featuring Casper the Friendly Ghost – Casper Genie / Harveytoon – Right off the Bat / Harvey ToonTake featuring Swifty and Shorty (a.k.a. Ralph and Percy) – TV or Not TV
 Episode 34: Herman and Katnip – From Mad to Worse / Harveytoon featuring Casper the Friendly Ghost – Doing What's Fright / Harveytoon presents a Modern Madcap featuring Silly Stork – Stork Raving Mad / Harvey ToonTake featuring Baby Huey – One Quack Mind
 Episode 35: Herman and Katnip – Hide and Peak / Harveytoon presents  Casper the Friendly Ghost – Ice Scream / Harveytoon featuring Inchy Worm – Oily Bird / Harvey ToonTake featuring Baby Huey – Scout Fellow
 Episode 36: Casper the Friendly Ghost – Down to Mirth / Harveytoon featuring Mortimer Tortoise and the Hare – Turtle Scoop / Harveytoon presents a Modern Madcap – The Inquisit Visit / Harvey ToonTake featuring Herman and Katnip – Cat in the Act
 Episode 37: Casper the Friendly Ghost – Ground Hog Play / Harveytoon featuring Buzzy and Katnip (re-dubbed soundtrack) – Sock-a-Bye Kitty / Harveytoon presents a Modern Madcap – Talking Horse Sense / Harvey ToonTake – Aero-Nutics
 Episode 38: Casper the Friendly Ghost – Keep Your Grin Up / Harveytoon featuring Tommy Tortoise and Moe Hare – Sleuth But Sure / Harveytoon featuring Possum Pearl – Possum Pearl / Harvey ToonTake featuring Mike the Masquerader – Disguise the Limit
 Episode 39: Party Smarty featuring Baby Huey / Harveytoon presents Casper the Friendly Ghost – Casper's Birthday Party / Harveytoon presents a Modern Madcap – Miceniks / Harvey ToonTake featuring Professor Schmaltz – Mighty Termite

Season 4
 Episode 40: Casper the Friendly Ghost – Not Ghoulty / Harveytoon featuring Buzzy and Katnip (re-dubbed soundtrack) – Hair Today, Gone Tomorrow / Harveytoon presents a Modern Madcap – Galaxia / Harvey ToonTake – Trick or Tree
 Episode 41: Casper the Friendly Ghost – Penguin for Your Thoughts / Harveytoon featuring Tommy Tortoise and Moe Hare – Mr. Money Gags / Harveytoon presents a Modern Madcap – Electronica / Harvey ToonTake featuring Mike the Masquerader – Disguise the Limit
 Episode 42: Casper the Friendly Ghost – Spook and Span / Harveytoon presents Herman and Katnip – Mice Paradise / Harveytoon featuring Danny Dinosaur – Cock-a-Doodle Dino / Harvey ToonTake Little Audrey – Little Audrey Riding Hood
 Episode 43: Casper the Friendly Ghost – Zero to Hero / Harveytoon featuring Buzzy and Katnip (re-dubbed soundtrack) – Cat-Choo / Harveytoon presents a Modern Madcap – Finnegan's Flea / Harvey ToonTake – No Place Like Rome
 Episode 44: Herman and Katnip – City Kitty / Harveytoon presents Casper the Friendly Ghost – Spooking Africa / Harveytoon presents a Modern Madcap – Travelaffs / Harvey ToonTake featuring Swifty and Shorty (a.k.a. Ralph and Percy) – Without Time or Reason
 Episode 45: Herman and Katnip – Northwest Mousie / Harveytoon presents Casper the Friendly Ghost – Dutch Treat / Harveytoon presents a Modern Madcap – Fit to Be Toyed / Harvey ToonTake – No Place Like Rome
 Episode 46: Casper the Friendly Ghost – Boo Bop / Harveytoon featuring Buzzy and Katnip (re-dubbed soundtrack) – Better Bait Than Never / Harveytoon featuring Julius – Houndabout / Harvey ToonTake featuring Swifty and Shorty (a.k.a. Ralph and Percy) – TV or Not TV
 Episode 47: Herman and Katnip – Rail Rodents / Harveytoon presents Casper the Friendly Ghost – Spook No Evil / Harveytoon presents a Modern Madcap featuring Mike the Masquerader – Mike the Masquerader / Harvey ToonTake featuring Baby Huey – Huey's Father's Day
 Episode 48: Herman and Katnip – Of Mice and Magic / Harveytoon presents Casper the Friendly Ghost – Puss 'N' Boos / Harveytoon presents a Modern Madcap – Funderful Suburbia / Harvey ToonTake featuring Jeeper and Creeper – The Boss is Always Right
 Episode 49: Casper the Friendly Ghost – Ghost of Honor / Harvey ToonTake Buzzy and Katnip (re-dubbed soundtrack) – The Awful Tooth / Harveytoon presents a Modern Madcap featuring Skit and Scat – Planet Mouseola / Harvey ToonTake – Off We Glow
 Episode 50: Herman and Katnip – Surf and Sound / Harveytoon presents Casper the Friendly Ghost – Spunky Skunky / Harveytoon presents a Modern Madcap – The Phantom Moustacher / Harvey ToonTake featuring Tommy Tortoise and Moe Hare – Mr. Money Gags
 Episode 51: Casper the Friendly Ghost – Ghost of the Town / Harveytoon featuring Buzzy and Katnip (re-dubbed soundtrack) – As the Crow Lies / Harveytoon presents a Modern Madcap featuring Sir Reginald Tweedledum IV – The Lion's Busy / Harvey ToonTake featuring Swifty and Shorty – Hi-Fi Jinx
 Episode 52: Casper the Friendly Ghost – Spooking with a Brogue / Harveytoon presents Herman and Katnip – Will Do Mousework / Harveytoon presents a Modern Madcap featuring Skit and Scat – Be Mice to Cats / Harvey ToonTake featuring Inchy Worm – The Oily Bird

Season 5
 Episode 53: Casper the Friendly Ghost – Fright-day the 13th / Harveytoon presents Herman and Katnip – Frighty Cat / Harveytoon – Spooking of Ghosts / Harvey ToonTake featuring Waxey Weasel and Wishbone – Poop Goes the Weasel
 Episode 54: Casper the Friendly Ghost – To Boo or Not to Boo / Harveytoon presents Herman and Katnip – Mousieur Herman / Harveytoon featuring Goodie the Gremlin – Good and Guilty / Harvey ToonTake – Miners 49ers
 Episode 55: Herman and Katnip – Cat Carson Rides Again / Harveytoon presents Casper the Friendly Ghost – Boos and Saddles / Harveytoon presents a Modern Madcap featuring The Cat – Cane and Able / Harvey ToonTake featuring Little Audrey – Little Audrey Riding Hood
 Episode 56: Casper the Friendly Ghost – Line of Scream-age / Harveytoon featuring  Tommy Tortoise and Moe Hare – Winner by a Hare / Harveytoon presents a Modern Madcap – Sportickles / Harvey ToonTake featuring Herman and Katnip – Robin Rodenthood
 Episode 57: Casper the Friendly Ghost – Puss 'N' Boos / Harveytoon presents Herman and Katnip – Felineous Assault / Harveytoon featuring Kitty Kuddles – Kitty Kornered / Harvey ToonTake featuring Baby Huey – Git Along Little Ducky
 Episode 58: Quack-A-Doodle Doo (untitled) featuring Baby Huey / Harveytoon presents Casper the Friendly Ghost – Red, White and Boo / Harveytoon presents a Modern Madcap – Grateful Gus / Harvey ToonTake featuring Herman and Katnip – Of Mice and Magic
 Episode 59: Herman and Katnip – Fun on Furlough (banned short) / Harveytoon presents Casper the Friendly Ghost – Boo Moon / Harveytoon presents a Modern Madcap featuring Renoir the Matchmaker – L'Amour the Merrier / Harvey ToonTake – From Dime to Dime
 Episode 60: Herman and Katnip – Katnip's Big Day / Harveytoon presents Casper the Friendly Ghost – Which Is Witch / Harveytoon – Sir Irving and Jeames / Harvey ToonTake featuring Wolfie – Fresh Yeggs
 Episode 61: Casper the Friendly Ghost – Doing What's Fright / Harveytoon featuring Little Audrey – Audrey the Rainmaker / Harveytoon presents a Modern Madcap featuring Renoir the Matchmaker – La Petite Parade / Harvey ToonTake featuring Wolfie – Fresh Yeggs
 Episode 62: Casper the Friendly Ghost – Boo-Hoo Baby / Harveytoon presents Herman and Katnip – Herman the Cartoonist / Harveytoon presents a Modern Madcap featuring Jeeper and Creeper – Trouble Date / Harvey ToonTake featuring Jeeper and Creeper – The Boss is Always Right
 Episode 63: Casper the Friendly Ghost – Casper Genie / Harveytoon featuring Goodie the Gremlin – Goodie the Gremlin / Harveytoon presents a Modern Madcap featuring Silly Stork – Monkey Doodles / Harvey ToonTake featuring Skit and Scat – Counter Attack
 Episode 64: Casper the Friendly Ghost – Fright from Wrong / Harveytoon featuring Little Audrey – Surf Bored / Harveytoon presents a Modern Madcap featuring The Cat – Cool Cat Blues / Harvey ToonTake featuring Jeeper and Creeper – Busy Buddies
 Episode 65: Casper the Friendly Ghost – Dutch Treat / Harveytoon featuring Baby Huey – Swab the Duck / Harveytoon presents a Modern Madcap featuring Professor Schmaltz – Fiddle Faddle / Harvey ToonTake – Miners 49ers

Season 6
 Episode 66: Casper the Friendly Ghost – A Visit from Mars / Harveytoon presents Casper the Friendly Ghost – Hide and Shriek / Harveytoon - Abner the Baseball
 Episode 67: Casper the Friendly Ghost – The Absent-Minded Robot / Harveytoon presents Richie Rich – Bugged Out / Casper the Friendly Ghost – The Magic Touch / Harveytoon presents a Modern Madcap – Crumley Cogswell (banned short)
 Episode 68: Casper the Friendly Ghost – Bedtime Troubles / Harveytoon presents Richie Rich – Back in the Saddle / Harveytoon presents Casper the Friendly Ghost – Mother Goose Land / Harveytoon presents a Modern Madcap featuring Professor Schmaltz – Giddy Gadget (banned short)
 Episode 69: Casper the Friendly Ghost – Bored Billionaire / Harveytoon presents Richie Rich – Girls Only / Harveytoon presents Casper the Friendly Ghost – Professor's Problem
 Episode 70: Casper the Friendly Ghost – City Snickers / Harveytoon presents Richie Rich – Dognapped / Harveytoon presents Casper the Friendly Ghost – Red Robbing Hood / Harvey ToonTake – Fiesta Time
 Episode 71: Casper the Friendly Ghost – Boo Scout / Harveytoon – Crazytown / Harveytoon presents Casper the Friendly Ghost – Small Spooks / Harveytoon – Peck Your Own Home (banned short)
 Episode 72: Casper the Friendly Ghost – The Enchanted Horse / Harveytoon presents Richie Rich – Invasion of the Cadbury Robots / Harveytoon presents Casper the Friendly Ghost – Super Spooks
 Episode 73: Casper the Friendly Ghost – The Enchanted Prince / Harveytoon presents Richie Rich – Rich and Chocolatey / Harveytoon presents Casper the Friendly Ghost – The Timid Knight / Harveytooon presents a Modern Madcap – Slip Us Some Redskin (banned short)
 Episode 74: Casper the Friendly Ghost – The Greedy Giants / Harveytoon presents Richie Rich – Richie's Great Race / Casper the Friendly Ghost – Twin Trouble / Harveytoon presents a Modern Madcap featuring Professor Schmaltz – Terry the Terror (banned short)
 Episode 75: Casper the Friendly Ghost – Growing Up / Harveytoon presents Richie Rich – One of a Kind / Harveytoon presents Casper the Friendly Ghost – The Wandering Ghosts / Harveytoon presents a Modern Madcap – Trigger Treat (banned short)
 Episode 76: Casper the Friendly Ghost – True Boo / Harveytoon presents Richie Rich – Roughin' It / Harveytoon presents Casper the Friendly Ghost – Weather or Not / Harvey ToonTake featuring Inchy Worm – Dizzy Dinosaurs
 Episode 77: Casper the Friendly Ghost – Kings of Toyland / Harveytoon presents Richie Rich – Richie's Circus / Harveytoon presents Casper the Friendly Ghost – Wendy's Wish / Harvey ToonTake – Fun at the Fair
 Episode 78: Casper the Friendly Ghost – Little Lost Ghost / Harveytoon presents Richie Rich – The Love Potion / Harveytoon presents Richie Rich – Nothing to Hiccup At

Toontakes
The following is list of Famous Studios shorts that are part of the Harveytoon library and which were included as fragments at the end of the show, some of which are Screen Songs with the sing-along portions taken out:
 Casper's Spree Under the Sea – Casper the Friendly Ghost
 Fresh Yeggs – Harveytoon featuring Wolfie
 Fiesta Time – Harveytoon
 Tweet Music – Harveytoon featuring Inchy Worm
 Drippy Mississippi – Harveytoon
 Hold the Lion Please – Harvey Girls featuring Little Audrey
 Miners 49ers – Harveytoon
 By Leaps and Hounds – Harveytoon featuring Herbert
 Vegetable Vaudeville – Kartunes
 Snooze Reel – Kartunes
 Off We Glow – Kartunes
 Cat Carson Rides Again – Harveytoon featuring Herman and Katnip
 Fun at the Fair – Kartunes
 Law and Audrey – Little Audrey
 Dizzy Dinosaurs – Kartunes featuring Inchy Worm
 Gag and Baggage – Kartunes
 Clown on the Farm – Baby Huey
 Forest Fantasy – Kartunes featuring Inchy Worm
 Hysterical History – Kartunes
 Starting from Hatch – Baby Huey
 Winner by a Hare – Harveytoon featuring Tommy Tortoise and Moe Hare
 Aero-Nutics – Kartunes
 Invention Convention – Kartunes
 No Place Like Rome – Kartunes
 Northwest Mousie – Herman and Katnip
 Surf and Sound – Herman and Katnip
 Candy Cabaret – Harveytoon
 Sleuth But Sure – Harveytoon featuring Tommy Tortoise and Moe Hare
 Fishing Tackler – Harvey Girls featuring Little Audrey
 Ice Scream – Casper the Friendly Ghost
 Houndabout – Harveytoon
 The Boss is Always Right – Jeeper and Creeper
 From Dime to Dime – Modern Madcaps
 Busy Buddies – Jeepers and Creepers
 Counter Attack – Harveytoon featuring Skit and Scat
 Disguise the Limit – Modern Madcaps featuring Mike the Masquerader
 Mighty Termite – Modern Madcaps featuring Professor Schmaltz
 Hound About That – Harveytoon featuring Harry the Hound
 Trick or Tree – Harveytoon
 Without Time or Reason – Harveytoon featuring Swifty and Shorty (a.k.a. Ralph and Percy)
 Hi-Fi Jinx – Modern Madcaps featuring Swifty and Shorty (a.k.a. Ralph and Percy)
 TV or Not TV – Harveytoon featuring Swifty and Shorty (a.k.a. Ralph and Percy)

Not included on the show
This is list of 14 theatrical Harvey-owned Famous Studios shorts and one Film Roman Richie Rich episode that were not included on the show, neither as full cartoons nor as "Toon Takes".

Produced by Famous Studios:
 Sing Again Of Michigan – Harveytoon featuring Buzzy the Crow
 Philharmaniacs - Kartunes
 No If's Ands or Butts – Harveytoon featuring Buzzy the Crow

Produced by Paramount Cartoon Studios:
 Chew Chew Baby - Harveytoon
 Fun On Furlough – Herman and Katnip
 Trigger Treat – Modern Madcaps
 Peck Your Own Home – Harveytoon
 Turning The Fables – Harveytoon featuring Mortimer Tortoise and the Hare
 Northern Mites – Harveytoon
 Terry the Terror – Modern Madcaps featuring Professor Schmaltz
 In The Nicotine – Modern Madcaps
 The Plot Sickens – Modern Madcaps
 Crumley Cogwell – Modern Madcaps
 Giddy Gadgets – Modern Madcaps featuring Professor Schmaltz

Produced by Film Roman:
 Cleaned Out - Richie Rich

Home releases
In January 2005, a single DVD release titled "Hooky Spooky" containing three episodes of this series (the Casper and Friends version) was released by Right Entertainment/Universal Pictures Video in the United Kingdom.

In 2006, Classic Media released 52 of the show's 78 episodes on a four-disc DVD set titled Harvey Toons – The Complete Collection. The set received mixed reviews from animation fans, and the show's consultant, Jerry Beck, said Classic Media did not consult with him on making this DVD release. He stated that he would not have included the show's formatting of those cartoons, but did applaud Classic Media for the very good picture quality of the included shorts and for the set's low price tag, considering the high number of cartoons in the set. In 2011, Vivendi Entertainment and Classic Media released all Herman and Katnip cartoons on a single disc DVD set titled Herman and Katnip: The Complete Collection. Also in 2011, Shout! Factory released 61 of 78 Casper cartoons from The Harveytoons Show on a three-disc DVD set titled Casper the Friendly Ghost: The Complete Collection.

References

External links
The Big Cartoon Database: Harvey Entertainment

1950 American television series debuts
1962 American television series endings
1950s American animated television series
1960s American animated television series
1950s American anthology television series
1960s American anthology television series
American children's animated anthology television series
English-language television shows
Harvey Comics series and characters
Television series by Universal Television
Television shows based on Harvey Comics
YTV (Canadian TV channel) original programming